One True Thing, originally known as Scarab, was an American pop rock band from Long Island, New York. The band gained notable attention when lead singer, Melanie Wills, sang on two From Autumn to Ashes' songs, "Short Stories With Tragic Endings" and "Autumn’s Monologue."

Band members
Melanie Wills - vocals
Milan Millevoy - guitar
Mike Pilato - bass
Ray Greene - drums

Discography

Albums
Finally... (2002, reissued 2004)

References

External links
Official Site (Archived Page)
Official Bio (Archived Page)

One True Thing at PureVolume

American pop rock music groups
Musical groups from Long Island